The following is a list of the Venezuela national football team's competitive records and statistics.

Individual records

Player records 

Players in bold are still active with Venezuela.

Most capped players

Top goalscorers

Manager records

Team records

Competition records

FIFA World Cup

Copa América

 Champions   Runners-up   Third place   Fourth place

Pan American Games

Head-to-head record 
The list shows the Venezuela national football team all-time international record against opposing nations.

As of 15 November 2022.

References

Venezuela national football team records and statistics
National association football team records and statistics